Rebele is a surname of German origin. Notable people with the surname include:
 Brynne Rebele-Henry (born 1999), American author
 Hans Rebele (1943–2023), German footballer

German-language surnames